LBT may refer to:

In government and politics:
Local Body Tax, in India

Places:
Larbert railway station, Scotland, station code
Lötschberg Base Tunnel, a railway tunnel under the Swiss Alps
Lumberton Municipal Airport (IATA Airport code: LBT)

In science and technology:
Large Binocular Telescope, in Arizona, US
Taylorcraft LBT, a U.S. WWII glider aircraft

Other uses:
Long Beach Transit, California, US